Gandy Bridge is the southernmost bridge spanning Old Tampa Bay from St. Petersburg, Florida to Tampa, Florida. The original 1924 span was dismantled in 1975. The second bridge, constructed in 1956 was used for vehicular traffic until 1997, when it was converted to recreational use by non-motorized traffic. It became known as the Friendship Trail Bridge and was demolished in 2016, after closing in 2008 due to hazardous conditions and several failed efforts to preserve the span. The third (1975) and fourth (1997) spans of the Gandy Bridge are currently being used for vehicle traffic.

Almost three miles long, the Gandy Bridge is one of three bridges connecting the mainland of Hillsborough County and Pinellas County; the others being the Howard Frankland Bridge and the Courtney Campbell Causeway.

Original span (1924–1975)

In 1910, H. Walter Fuller was a director of three companies owned by F. A. Davis. George S. Gandy Sr was the president of all three companies. Fuller prepared a map including a proposed bridge that would cross upper Tampa Bay following the route of Ninth Street North in St. Petersburg. Gandy partnered with Fuller, incorporating three companies towards design and construction of the bridge. Survey crews decided to change the route from Ninth Street to Fourth Street. In 1918, World War I required that all projects exceeding $250,000 required a certificate of necessity from the War Industries Board headed by Bernard Baruch. The project was not approved and financing was canceled. Gandy bought out Fuller's interests and continued alone.

In 1922, Gandy hired promoter Eugene M. Elliott to attract new investment. Gandy sold enough stock to finance the bridge, which cost $1.932 million. Construction began in September 1922 and the bridge was completed for a formal opening on November 20, 1924. The steel and concrete bridge spanned a distance of two and a half miles, making it the longest automobile toll bridge in the world at that time. The original toll to cross the bridge was $.75 for an automobile and driver and $.10 for additional passengers. The bridge stopped collecting tolls on April 27, 1944, after it was seized by the administration of Franklin D. Roosevelt. On December 23, 1945, a federal jury awarded The Gandy Company $2,383,642 in compensation for the property, plus $100,000 in interest.

Its location enabled travel by auto along the route of the world's first scheduled airline flight, which operated between Tampa and Saint Petersburg for six months in 1914.

The Gandy Bridge opened on November 20, 1924 Sixteen visiting state governors and several foreign dignitaries attended the opening ceremony. During George Gandy's speech, he stated; "The bridge is built!"

The bridge was dismantled in 1975 immediately after completion of a third span. Efforts to preserve the bridge for recreational purposes were not supported by the Pinellas County Commission, which felt the idea was too expensive, too dangerous, and unnecessary.

Second span (1956–1997, demolished as of 2016)
By 1947, state Sen. Raymond Sheldon described the bridge as "outmoded, too narrow and a traffic bottleneck." In 1956 a second slightly higher, fixed span was added to the Gandy Bridge to serve westbound traffic. The first span would then serve eastbound traffic until 1975. The second bridge remained in use until February 1997.

Friendship Trail Bridge (1999–2008)
Years before, the Florida Department of Transportation (FDOT) deemed the bridge structurally deficient to vehicular traffic unless costly repairs were made. FDOT initially planned to demolish the middle section of the bridge (including the hump) and leave the remaining fishing pier segments intact. The demolished segments would have then been used for an artificial reef. When residents and community groups in both Pinellas and Hillsborough Counties lobbied together against FDOT and the governments of the two counties to save the 1956 bridge, FDOT dropped its demolition plan. After two years of hearings and funding issues, the 1956 bridge reopened to pedestrian and bicycle traffic on December 11, 1999, as the Friendship Trail Bridge.

On November 6, 2008, the Friendship Trail was shut down "indefinitely" (though the ends remained open) after a state inspection determined that there were significant structural problems with the bridge's superstructure. The bridge had been decaying for years, eventually forcing the closure of the span to vehicular traffic. However, the inspection yielded that the corrosion of the superstructure had worsened and that the overall condition of the bridge was no longer suitable to keep it open due to safety issues. Only a couple months before, the Sunshine Skyway Bridge's fishing piers were deemed to the same fate (A recent inspection there had forced the closure of the eastern span on both the northern and southern piers). There was also a repair plan in place for the bridge that would have repaired the pylons at a cost of $4.2 million. That project was cancelled due to the new developments.

December 17 brought further gloom for the trail when preliminary estimates to retrofit the bridge added up to about $30 million. Furthermore, the projected costs would only provide a temporary solution to the structure that would only last about ten years. With the state and the nation in recession, county governments saw no way to meet the staggering costs, leaving the trail likely closed for good.

December 20, 2008 a report done by Kisinger Campo & Associates and SDR Engineering Consultants showed that the bridge could potentially collapse due to the amount of decay on the structure. Immediately after the report was released, Hillsborough and Pinellas County officials decided to close the entire bridge permanently. The report suggested the following:
 $4.1 million to retrofit both ends of the bridge only
 $13 million to demolish the bridge only
 $30 million to retrofit the entire structure
 $81.1 million to demolish and rebuild the bridge

In May 2009, the initial estimates were revised:
 $10 million to retrofit both ends of the bridge only
 $13 million to demolish the bridge only
 $15 million to retrofit the entire structure
 $19 million to demolish and rebuild fishing piers

After a series of meetings in May, June, and July 2009, the Friendship Trail bridge oversight committee voted to explore the $15 million option to retrofit the entire bridge, which would add about 10 years to its lifespan, with supporters hoping that it would be funded by the American Recovery and Reinvestment Act. A peer review done by E.C. Driver and Associates disagreed on the repair estimate claiming it would take $48 million to repair the bridge.

Also in July 2009, the animal rights group, People for the Ethical Treatment of Animals (PETA) offered to contribute funds to help save the Friendship Trail. However, the group asked for fishing to be banned throughout the entire span.

In April 2010, both Hillsborough and Pinellas County Commissions voted to demolish the entire structure. The commissions are still proposing ways to commence demolition and a timetable has not yet been set.

In March 2011, citizens came together to save the bridge again, proposing a public/private partnership to fund repairs.

In April 2011, Hillsborough County Commission voted to delay the demolition in order to give a group of citizens 30 days to come up with a viable plan to repair and re-open the bridge

On June 27, 2012, the Hillsborough County Commission voted to allow the group more time to evaluate their options for the bridge. It would also allow the commission to decide on a plan to possibly present a referendum to voters in November to hike the property tax to fund park improvements.

Despite the various community efforts to save the bridge, none were able to fully materialize. As of September 2015, the span was gradually being demolished, with guardrails and lighting being removed. Afterwards, the span cut away in sections and hauled off site for recycling. Demolition work was completed as of July 2016.

Third span (1975–present) & Fourth span (1996–present)

A third span was opened to traffic on October 20, 1975, and was originally without street lighting. This replaced the original span which was immediately dismantled.

On December 21, 1996, another parallel span was built in between the two existing spans to replace the aging 1956 bridge. The new bridge was initially opened to eastbound traffic while the 1975 bridge was closed to allow FDOT to install street lighting and conduct other bridge work. Westbound traffic at that time continued to utilize the 1956 bridge. The 1996 bridge was converted to westbound traffic in February 1997.

Differences between the spans
The differences between the three bridges are obvious to observers. The westbound span is nine feet higher than the older eastbound span, and has a more gradual hump than its counterpart. The design and architecture of the westbound bridge is similar to the Clearwater Pass Bridge replacement, which was completed in 1994.

Fifth Span (Future)

In June 2021, FDOT announced that it is conducting a study to construct a fifth span to eventually replace the aging third (1975) span. The new span is slated to be constructed along the north side of the fourth (1996) span, perhaps right over where the second (1956) span once stood. While the agency has identified that work will include widening the fourth span, it is currently unclear as to whether the span will only have widened shoulders, or if an additional travel lane will be added. It is also unclear as to how many lanes the new span will have, though a trail component will be included to replace the trail link lost when the second span was demolished, thus fully reactivating the Friendship Trail. Should FDOT commence with the project, the design phase will begin sometime in 2025. Upon completion of the fifth span, all three Pinellas-Hillsborough bridge crossings over Old Tampa Bay will have trail components. Also, the fifth span will serve westbound traffic while the fourth span will switch to handling eastbound traffic.

Mishap history
Several barges have struck one of the spans of the Gandy Bridge throughout the years.

December 12, 1970: A barge hits the drawbridge when it doesn't open in time, cracking several pilings
February 6, 1981: The barge Liquilassie, towed by the tug Tusker, swings wide on a starboard turn and strikes Gandy Bridge, damaging a support column.
August 31, 1985: Two barges break their moorings and, powered by waves from Hurricane Elena, crash into the southernmost span of the bridge.
March 31, 1988: The shrimp boat Madonna T. Tillman sinks after striking the center of the bridge while being towed by another shrimp boat.
March 31, 2006: The 285-foot-long steel barge Apache, towed by the tug Crosby Skipper, swings wide on a turn and slams into a concrete support column. Chunks of reinforced concrete dropped onto the barge's deck, and cracks rippled through the 48-foot-long beam.

See also

References

External links

 / Save the Friendship Trail Bridge
 Friendship Trail Bridge

Bridges completed in 1924
Transportation in Tampa, Florida
Bridges completed in 1956
Former road bridges in the United States
Pedestrian bridges in the United States
Bridges completed in 1975
Bridges completed in 1996
Transportation in St. Petersburg, Florida
Buildings and structures in St. Petersburg, Florida
Road bridges in Florida
Former toll bridges in Florida
Bridges of the United States Numbered Highway System
1924 establishments in Florida
Bridges over Tampa Bay
U.S. Route 92
Steel bridges in the United States
Concrete bridges in the United States
Bridges in Pinellas County, Florida
Transportation buildings and structures in Hillsborough County, Florida